NeuroRehabilitation is a peer-reviewed medical journal covering all aspects of neurological rehabilitation. It was established in 1991 and is published by IOS Press. The editors-in-chief are Nathan D. Zasler (University of Virginia) and Jeffrey S. Kreutzer (Virginia Commonwealth University). The journal also occasionally publishes thematically organized issues that focus on specific clinical disorders, types of therapy, and age groups.

Abstracting and indexing 
The journal is abstracted and indexed by MEDLINE/PubMed and the Science Citation Index. According to the Journal Citation Reports, the journal has a 2013 impact factor of 1.736.

References

External links 
 

Neurology journals
IOS Press academic journals
English-language journals
Publications established in 1991
Hybrid open access journals